Isaac Tutumlu López (born 5 July 1985) is a Spanish racing driver. He currently races in the ADAC GT MASTERS, having formerly raced in the World Touring Car Championship, International GT Open, Porsche Supercup, Daytona 24 Hours and others.

Racing career
Tutumlu began his career racing in the karting championships in Catalonia (Spain). He moved into cars by competing in the Mitjet Series in 2007. In 2008 he won the Catalunya Touring Car Championship. In 2009 he began racing in GTs, competing in five rounds of the Porsche Supercup as well as starting International GT Open and Spanish GT Championship races.

At the start of 2011 he entered the Superstars Series in a BMW M3 for the Spanish team Campos Racing. However, he would only participate in the first three rounds of the season. Later in the year he returned to the Porsche Supercup.

Porsche Supercup
Tutumlu first entered the Porsche Supercup when he entered five rounds at the championship with SANITEC Racing, starting with the Nürburgring. He raced in the championship until the penultimate round at Monza, as a guest driver he was ineligible to score points.

He returned to the championship in 2011, beginning with a single race for MRS Team PZ Aschaffenburg at Monaco, however he was disqualified from the results. He reappeared at the Hungaroring with SANITEC Aquiles MRS Team and did two further races at Spa-Francorchamps and Abu Dhabi for Attempto Racing.

He returned to the Porsche Supercup in 2012 with Attempto Racing, starting with the second round of the championship at Barcelona.

World Touring Car Championship
In 2012 he signed to race in the World Touring Car Championship with Proteam Racing, again in a BMW. He was forced to miss the fourth round of the championship at the Slovakiaring due to damage sustained on his car in Marrakech. After the Race of Slovakia, he announced he would leave Proteam and the WTCC to return to the Porsche Supercup.

Blancpain Lamborghini Super Trofeo Europe
In 2015 he was confirmed as a driver in the Lamborghini Super Trofeo Europe. Isaac didn't race in the first weekend of the year at Monza and started his season in Silverstone driving for Leipert Motorsport. He's team-mate is the Austrian Gerhard Tweraser.

Personal life
Isaac Tutumlu López is of Kurdish descent from his father side and is from Spanish descent from his mothers' side. He is a Kurdish nationalist and sported the flag of Kurdistan on his BMW during his World Touring Car Championship stint. Tutumlu is the son of football agent Bayram Tutumlu who is from Turkey.

Racing record

Complete Porsche Supercup results
(key) (Races in bold indicate pole position) (Races in italics indicate fastest lap)

‡ Not eligible for points

Complete World Touring Car Championship results
(key) (Races in bold indicate pole position) (Races in italics indicate fastest lap)

References

External links
 
 
 

1985 births
Living people
Racing drivers from Barcelona
Spanish people of Kurdish descent
Turkish Kurdish people
Spanish racing drivers
World Touring Car Championship drivers
Porsche Supercup drivers
Superstars Series drivers
International GT Open drivers
Kurdish sportspeople
24 Hours of Daytona drivers
WeatherTech SportsCar Championship drivers
ADAC GT Masters drivers
24H Series drivers
Campos Racing drivers
Abt Sportsline drivers
Starworks Motorsport drivers
Porsche Carrera Cup Germany drivers